Welt im Film No. 5 was a newsreel meant to acquaint the German and Austrian public with what had taken place in the concentration camps, as part of the Denazification effort.

Welt im Film newsreels were co-productions by the military governments Control Commission for Germany - British Element (CCG/BE) and the Office of Military Government, United States (OMGUS) in Allied-occupied Germany after World War II. Screenings were compulsory.

See also 
Death Mills
List of Allied propaganda films of World War II
List of Holocaust films
The Nuremberg Trials - Soviet film about the Nuremberg trials
That Justice Be Done - American film about the Nuremberg trials

External links
Welt im Film no. 5 (part 1) Steven Spielberg Film and Video Archive at USHMM
Welt im Film no. 5 (part 2) Steven Spielberg Film and Video Archive at USHMM
 
 

1945 films
1945 documentary films
Black-and-white documentary films
American documentary films
American World War II propaganda films
1940s German-language films
Documentary films about the Holocaust
Newsreels
American black-and-white films